Hoscheckia is a genus of beetles in the family Buprestidae, containing the following species:

 Hoscheckia africana Thery, 1925
 Hoscheckia strandi (Obenberger, 1918)

References

Buprestidae genera